Kappa Andromedae, Latinized from κ Andromedae, is the Bayer designation for a bright star in the northern constellation of Andromeda. It is visible to the naked eye with an apparent visual magnitude of 4.1. Based on the star's ranking on the Bortle Dark-Sky Scale, it is luminous enough to be visible from the suburbs and from urban outskirts, but not from brightly lit inner city regions. It is drifting closer with a radial velocity of −15 km/s, and there is a high likelihood (86%) that it is a member of the Beta Pictoris moving group. The star has one known companion exoplanet, Kappa Andromedae b.

Properties
The stellar classification of Kappa Andromedae is B9 IVn, indicating that it is a subgiant star in the process of evolving away from the main sequence. The star has an estimated 2.8 times the mass of the Sun and is radiating 78.5 times the Sun's luminosity. It is spinning rapidly, with a projected rotational velocity of 162 km/s. Its true rotational velocity is 283.8 km/s, which is about 85% of its critical rotation rate (the rate at which it would break up). The outer envelope of the star is radiating energy into space with an effective temperature of 10,342 K at the equator and 12,050 K at its poles, producing a blue-white hue.

The age of Kappa Andromedae has been the subject of debate. The discovery paper for Kappa Andromedae b argued that the primary's kinematics are consistent with membership in the Columba Association, which would imply a system age of 20-50 million years, while a subsequent work derived an older age of 220±100 million years based on the star's position on the Hertzsprung-Russell diagram position  assuming that the star is not a fast rotator viewed pole-on. Direct measurements of the star later showed that Kappa Andromedae A is in fact a rapid rotator viewed nearly pole-on and yield a best-estimated age of 47 million years.

Planetary system

In November 2012, members of the Strategic Explorations of Exoplanets and Disks with Subaru (SEEDS) survey reported the discovery of a faint, directly-imaged companion Kappa Andromedae b.   Follow-up photometry and spectroscopy of kappa And b with the Subaru Telescope, Keck Observatory, and Large Binocular Telescope constrained its mass to be about 13 Jupiter masses, temperature to be between 1700 K and 2150 K, and orbit to be highly eccentric with a semimajor axis likely greater than about 75 AU.   The companion's spectrum shows evidence for water and carbon monoxide molecules and suggests the object has a low surface gravity.

Chinese naming

See also
 List of extrasolar planets directly imaged

References

External links
 Image κ Andromedae

B-type subgiants
Planetary systems with one confirmed planet

 
Andromeda (constellation)
Andromedae, Kappa
BD+433 4522
Andromedae, 19
222439
116805
8976